Cymindis rostowtzowi is a species of ground beetle in the subfamily Harpalinae. It was described by Tschitscherine in 1896.

References

rostowtzowi
Beetles described in 1896